Sir Francis Palmes (c. 1554 – 30 March 1613) was an English politician.

Early life and education
Francis Palmes was the son and heir of Sir Francis Palmes of Lindley and Margaret, the daughter of Roger Corbet of Moreton Corbet Castle, Shropshire, who he succeeded in 1560. He was educated at Magdalen College, Oxford and the Inner Temple in 1575.

Career
Palmes was Justice of the Peace for the West Riding of Yorkshire between 1582 and 1608. Between 1600 and 1608 he was the Justice of the Peace for Hampshire. He was a member of the high commission for the province of York in 1599 and Sheriff of Hampshire from 1600 to 1601. Palmes 'evidently prospered, perhaps as a lawyer'. He was a Member (MP) of the Parliament of England for Knaresborough in 1586.

In 1601 Palmes, as sheriff, received the Queen at Silchester and escorted her to Basingstoke, where she knighted him. He had married Mary, daughter and coheiress of Stephen Hadnall of Lancelevy, with whom he had 6 sons and 5 daughters. On his death he was succeeded by his eldest son Guy Palmes.

Courtiers at Lancelevy 
In August 1603 there was plague in England. The royal court moved to Basing House. Francis Palmes entertained courtiers at his house nearby at Lancelevy in Sherfield on Loddon. The party included Lady Anne Clifford, her mother Margaret Clifford, Countess of Cumberland and Elizabeth Bourchier, Countess of Bath, who used Lancelevy as a base to visit Anne of Denmark and Arbella Stuart. One night, riding from Basingstoke to Lancelevy, Anne Clifford saw a comet. The old house has been demolished and a moated site remains.

References

1550s births
1613 deaths
Alumni of Magdalen College, Oxford
Members of the Inner Temple
English MPs 1586–1587
High Sheriffs of Hampshire